All-Ukrainian Political Union Women for the Future is a political party in Ukraine registered on 30 March 2001. The party was created by Lyudmila Kuchma, a wife of the then serving President of Ukraine Leonid Kuchma. Among notable party candidates was Dmytro Firtash.

At the legislative elections of 30 March 2002, the party won 2.1% of the popular vote and no seats; although final poll results had predicted 5% till 6% of the total votes for the party. At the legislative elections of 26 March 2006, the party was part of the Opposition Bloc "Ne Tak". The party did not participate in the 2007 elections.

In a 2019 Ukrainian parliamentary election by-election on 15 March 2020 in electoral district 179 located in Kharkiv Oblast the party's candidate Olha Kovalenko received less than 160 votes (winner Yuliya Svitlychna received about 30.000 votes).

See also
 Dmytro Firtash

References

Political parties in Ukraine
Feminist organizations in Ukraine
Feminist parties in Europe
Political parties established in 2001
2001 establishments in Ukraine
Russian political parties in Ukraine